The Choctaw Nation may refer to:

 the Choctaw people, an indigenous ethnic group of the Southeastern Woodlands of North America
 Choctaw Nation of Oklahoma, a federally recognized tribe in Oklahoma
 Jena Band of Choctaw Indians, a federally recognized tribe in Louisiana
 Mississippi Band of Choctaw Indians, a federally recognized tribe in Mississippi
 Mississippi Choctaw Indian Federation